The Al-Haram or Al-Harm are a Bedouin tribe of Saudi Arabia, Sunni Arabs. An Al-Haram myth of origin asserts that they were originally protectors of the Kaaba in the Sacred Mosque or Masjid al-Haram in Mecca.

Jane Hathaway writes that the Haram are presented (but not explicitly stated) in Arab chronicles as a Bedouin tribal group, opposed to the Sa'd faction. The tribe "evidently had a lengthy presence in Yemen", as "pre-Islamic inscriptions in the south Arabian language refer to a H-R-MM". According to Hathaway, the mediaeval Moroccan traveller Ibn Battuta (1304-1377) reports that the 'Banu Haram' people lived in Hali in the north of Yemen. Similarly, Hathaway writes that Yahya b. al-Husayn reports that the Jabal Haram (the mountains of the Haram people) in northern Yemen "submitted to the Zaydi imam in the late thirteenth century".

Sultan bin Muhammad Al-Qasimi writes that in 1760, soldiers "fled to Qishm to seek assistance from Shaikh Rahmah and the Al Haram tribe" on the Persian coast.

Bibliography

 Hathaway, Jane. Myth, Memory, and Identity in Ottoman Egypt and Yemen. SUNY Press, 2003.  Google Books
  Al-Qasimi, Sultan Bin Muhammad. Power Struggles and Trade in the Gulf: 1620-1820. University of Exeter Press, 1999. Google Books

References

External links
 iTouchMap: Al Haram, Yemen

Tribes of Arabia